Minuscule 147 (in the Gregory-Aland numbering), ε 401 (Soden), is a Greek minuscule manuscript of the New Testament, on parchment leaves. Palaeographically it has been assigned to the 13th century. Birch and F. H. A. Scrivener dated to the 11th century, C. R. Gregory dated to the 14th century.

Description 

The codex contains a complete text of the four Gospels on 355 parchment leaves (size ). The parchment is fine and white.

The text is written in one column per page, in 20 lines per page. The capital letters in red.

Text 
The Greek text of the codex is a representative of the Byzantine text-type. Hermann von Soden classified it to the textual family Kr. Aland placed it in Category V. According to the Claremont Profile Method it belongs to the textual family Kr in Luke 1, 10, and 20. It creates textual cluster with the codex 547 and 511 (in Luke 1).

History 

The manuscript was examined and described by Birch (about 1782) and Scholz. C. R. Gregory saw it in 1886.

It is currently housed at the Vatican Library (Pal. gr. 89), at Rome.

See also 

 List of New Testament minuscules
 Biblical manuscript
 Textual criticism

References

Further reading 

 

Greek New Testament minuscules
13th-century biblical manuscripts
Manuscripts of the Vatican Library